Omprakash Khatik was an Indian politician belonging to Bhartiya Janata Party. He was three times member of the Madhya Pradesh Legislative Assembly, in 1990, 1993 and 2003, representing Kolaras. Omprakash was senior congress leader.

References

1950 births
2016 deaths
Bharatiya Janata Party politicians from Madhya Pradesh